Paraiso Ko'y Ikaw (International title: My Paradise / ) is a 2014 Philippine television drama romance series broadcast by GMA Network. Directed by Joyce E. Bernal, it stars Kim Rodriguez and Kristofer Martin. It premiered on January 27, 2014 on the network's Telebabad line up replacing Prinsesa ng Buhay Ko. The series concluded on March 28, 2014 with a total of 45 episodes.

Cast and characters
Lead cast
 Kim Rodriguez as Josephine E. Rodrigo
 Kristofer Martin as Christopher "Topher" Ilustre Rosales / Tupe Carriedo

Supporting cast
 Phytos Ramirez as Brix Ilustre / Brix Castillo
 Joyce Ching as Francheska "Cheska" Bartolome Rodrigo
 G. Toengi as Regina Ilustre-Verdadero
 Gabby Eigenmann as Edward Rodrigo
 Jessa Zaragoza as Yvette Bartolome-Rodrigo
 Sheryl Cruz as Teresa Enriquez-Rodrigo
 Dianne Medina as Elizabeth Castillo
 Neil Ryan Sese as Roberto "Berto" Rosales
 Janno Gibbs as Salvador "Badong / Bads" Carriedo
 Maricel Morales as Celia "Cel" Carriedo
 Ynez Veneracion as Sonya Estrella
 Joey Marquez as Artemio Estrella
 Irene Celebre as Doña Herminia Rodrigo
 Bubbles Paraiso as Alicia Rodrigo-Alfonso
 Julie Lee as Anne Enriquez

Guest cast
 Lauren Young as young Teresa
 Yassi Pressman as young Yvette 
 Ashley Ortega as young Regina 
 Jeric Gonzales as young Edward 
 Zandra Summer as young Elizabeth
 Arkin Del Rosario as young Berto

Ratings
According to AGB Nielsen Philippines' Mega Manila household television ratings, the pilot episode of Paraiso Ko'y Ikaw earned an 11.5% rating. While the final episode scored a 12% rating.

References

External links
 
 

2014 Philippine television series debuts
2014 Philippine television series endings
Filipino-language television shows
GMA Network drama series
Philippine romance television series
Television shows set in the Philippines